The Switchblade Valentines are a Canadian psychobilly band from Victoria. The band consists of R.P. Fogarty on vocals and guitar, Mikey Valentine on guitar and backing vocals, Pauly Valentine on drums, and Alec Valentine on stand up bass.

History
Switchblade Valentines was formed in 2004.  Fogarty left the band for a short time but eventually rejoined. The band performed around Vancouver in 2005 and in 2007. That year their EP Through the Flames was released; the band toured on the east coast in support of recording.

Discography
2005: ST
2007: Through Flames EP

Compilations
2005: Zombie Night in Canada Vol. 2 (Stumble Records)
 2006: Cavalcade of the Scars (Self Righteous)

Band members

Current members
R.P. Fogerty: vocals, Guitar
Mikey Valentine: backing vocals, Guitar
Pauly Valentine: drums
Alec Valentine: upright bass

See also
List of psychobilly bands

References

External links
Switchblade Valentines Official website
Switchblade Valentines at Myspace
Switchblade Valentines on CBC Radio 3
Maplemusic - Stumble Records

Musical groups established in 2004
Musical groups from Victoria, British Columbia
Canadian punk rock groups
Psychobilly groups
2004 establishments in British Columbia